This is a list of FM radio stations in the United States having call signs beginning with the letters WA through WC. Low-power FM radio stations, those with designations such as WAAK-LP, have not been included in this list.

WA--

WB--

WC--

See also
 North American call sign

FM radio stations in the United States by call sign (initial letters WA-WC)